Talk Talk Talk is the second studio album by rock band The Psychedelic Furs.

Talk Talk Talk or similar may also refer to:

 "Talk, Talk, Talk", a 2004 song by The Ordinary Boys
 "Talk Talk Talk" (song), a 2011 song by Darren Hayes
 Talk Talk Talk (film), a 2007 Japanese youth romantic drama film

See also
 Talk (disambiguation)
 Talk Talk (disambiguation)